Enne Snehikkoo Enne Maathram is a 1981 Indian Malayalam film, directed by P. G. Vishwambharan and produced by O. M. John. The film stars Srividya, Ratheesh, Sukumaran and Ambika in the lead roles. The film has musical score by K. V. Mahadevan.

Cast
 
M. G. Soman 
Sukumaran 
Ratheesh 
Srividya 
Ambika 
Bahadoor 
Kuthiravattam Pappu 
Seema

Soundtrack
The music was composed by K. V. Mahadevan and the lyrics were written by Yusufali Kechery.

References

External links
 

1981 films
1980s Malayalam-language films
Films scored by K. V. Mahadevan
Films directed by P. G. Viswambharan